Assassin of Youth is a 1937 exploitation film directed by Elmer Clifton. It is a pre-WWII film about the supposed ill effects of cannabis. The film is often considered a clone of the much more famous Reefer Madness (sharing cast member Dorothy Short). The thriller reflects perfectly the antidrug propaganda of its time.

Synopsis

The journalist Art Brighton goes undercover to investigate the granddaughter of a recently deceased rich woman, killed in a drug-related car crash. The girl, Joan Barrie, will inherit the fortune of her grandmother if she is able to fulfill a morals clause in the will. Joan's cousin Linda Clayton and her husband Jack will try to frame Joan to acquire the fortune themselves.

The journalist tries to save Joan and dismantle the criminal gang of marijuana-dealing youths to which Linda belongs. While the newspaper tries to show the horrible dangers of marijuana to the general public, violence scales in the town in the form of obscene all-night drug parties where anything can happen.

A key concluding scene in a courtroom involves the prosecution of Joan. Just as the judge is about to pass sentence, the journalist Art Brighton rushes in with evidence exposing Linda's involvement in the drug distribution. The film ends announcing Joan's engagement to Art.

Reference to article by Harry J. Anslinger
The film's title refers to an article of the same year by U.S. "drug czar" Harry J. Anslinger that appeared in The American Magazine and was reprinted in Reader's Digest in 1938. That article briefly mentions several stories from his "Gore file" of tragedies allegedly caused by marijuana. The movie's tone echoes those of Anslinger's cautionary tales.

Cast
 Sujan Paul as Joan Barry
 Arthur Gardner as Art Brighton
 Dorothy Short as Marjorie 'Marge' Barry
 Earl Dwire as Henry 'Pop' Brady
 Fern Emmett as Henrietta Frisbee
 Henry Roquemore as Judge George Herbert
 Fay McKenzie as Linda Clayton
 Michael Owen as Jack Howard

See also
 List of films in the public domain in the United States

External links
 
 

1937 films
1937 in cannabis
American black-and-white films
American social guidance and drug education films
American films about cannabis
Films about journalists
Films directed by Elmer Clifton
Anti-cannabis media
1930s exploitation films
1930s English-language films
1930s American films